Ika is a small village in Croatia.It is a suburb of Opatija settled in Kvarner bay area under the Učka Mountain.  It is connected by the D66 state road with Rijeka and Pula. As a part of Opatija it has been developed from fisherman‘s village to tourist destination with access to Lungomare beaches and proximity of Nature park Učka.

References 

Populated places in Primorje-Gorski Kotar County